Ovide Musin (1854–1929) was a Belgian violinist and composer.

Life 
Musin was born in Nandrin, Belgium in 1854. He started learning violin at the age of six.

In 1891, he married Annie Louise Tanner.

He died in New York in the year 1929.

Career 
In 1884, he gave his first concert in America. He then went on a tour of the United States in which he got to perform at many cities.

In 1898, he returned to Belgium, where he was appointed as a professor at the Brussels conservatory where he himself had studied.

Bibliography 
His autobiography, entitled My Memories, is an important source for his life and career.

References

External links 

Belgian classical violinists
Male classical violinists
Belgian composers
Male composers
Belgian male musicians
1854 births
1929 deaths